Tomako or tomoko is a large war canoe from the Solomon Islands. The name "tomako" is used in New Georgia in the Roviana language. It is also known as magoru in Marovo, niabara in Vella Lavella, mon in Bougainville, ora in Makira, and iola or ola in Malaita and Ulawa. They did not possess outriggers or sails and were propelled solely by paddling. They were built by fitting planks edge-to-edge which are then "sewn" together and caulked with a paste made from the nut of the tree Parinarium laurinum. They could carry 30 to 50 warriors, and were used in raiding expeditions for slaves or for headhunting. These carvings are usually of spirit animals or warriors like the kesoko (a bird or sea spirit) and Tiolo (a warrior deity). The body is commonly blackened to contrast with the decorations.

Tomako usually took 2 to 3 years to build using traditional stone and shell adzes. They were kept in sacred houses known as paele, which also housed human heads taken during battle. Tomako is similar to the lisi, another common boat type in the Solomon Islands which also lacks outriggers, but differs in that the topmost strakes of the lisi have a gap in the middle. It also resembles the orembai of the Maluku Islands, except the latter usually has a sail.

The last canoes used for war were confiscated by the British colonial government in the Solomon Islands during the early 1900s to stop headhunting raids. It was eventually bought by a private German collector. However, new canoes were built at around 1910–1912. They were used for canoe-racing, encouraged by the colonial government to preserve the traditional boat-building practices. In the 11th Festival of Pacific Arts in 2012 hosted by the Solomon Islands, several Tomako were built and displayed.

Gallery

See also 
 Binabina
 Lisi (boat)
 Waka taua
 Salisipan
 Kelulus
 Ipanitika

References

Austronesian ships